Richard Basset, 1st Baron Basset (died 1314), Lord of Weldon, was an English noble.

Richard was a son of Ralph Basset and Eleanor de la Wade. He was summoned to Parliament between 1299 and 1314. Richard was captured during the Battle of Bannockburn, Scotland on 24 June 1314. He later died in captivity.

Marriage and issue
Richard married Joan de Huntingfield, they are known to have had the following known issue:
Ralph Basset, married Joan had issue.
Richard Basset
Robert Basset

Citations

Year of birth unknown
1314 deaths
13th-century English people
14th-century English people